Frank Stephens may refer to:
Frank Stephens (advocate) (born 1981 or 1982), American disability advocate, actor and athlete
Frank Stephens (Australian footballer) (1927–1998), Australian rules footballer for North Melbourne and South Melbourne
Frank Stephens (cricketer) (1889–1970), English cricketer
Frank Stephens (naturalist) (1849-1937), American naturalist
Frank Stephens (rugby) (1899–1971), Welsh rugby player
Frank Stephens (sculptor) (1859–1935), American sculptor and co-founder of an utopian community
Frank Stephens (surgeon) (1913–2011), Australian surgeon
Frank B. Stephens, member of the Mississippi House of Representatives
Frank Stephens (baseball), American Negro league pitcher

See also
Frank Stevens (disambiguation)
Francis Stephens (disambiguation)
Franklin Stevens (disambiguation)